Ashley Steven Jackson (born 27 August 1987) is an English field hockey player who plays club hockey as a defender or midfielder for Old Georgians'.

He represented the England and Great Britain national teams from 2006 until 2021.

In December 2014 Jackson began playing ice hockey for Invicta Dynamos, scoring a goal on his debut against London Raiders.

In June 2017, together with his brother, Wesley Jackson, he founded Jackson coaching.

Club career
Jackson plays club hockey in the Men's England Hockey League Premier Division for Old Georgians', whom he joined in 2019.

He has also played for East Grinstead, Holcombe and two spells for HGC in the Dutch League, as well as for Ranchi Rhinos in the Hockey India League.

He first started playing hockey for Tunbridge Wells Hockey Club whilst a schoolboy at Sutton Valence, Kent.

International career
Jackson made his full international debut for Great Britain in 2007 Men's Hockey Champions Trophy and for England in 2009 Men's Hockey Champions Trophy. He went on to win gold in the 2009 Men's EuroHockey Nations Championship where he also won the Player of the Tournament. He was named FIH Young Player of the year 2009 and is the first English player to receive this accolade. He competed in the 2008 Summer Olympics in Beijing, finishing 4th at the 2012 Summer Olympics in London and competed in his third at the Rio 2016 Summer Olympics. Jackson also played in the England squad that won Bronze at the 2014 Commonwealth Games.

References

External links
 
 
 

Living people
1987 births
Sportspeople from Chatham, Kent
English male field hockey players
Male field hockey midfielders
Field hockey players at the 2004 Summer Olympics
Field hockey players at the 2008 Summer Olympics
Field hockey players at the 2010 Commonwealth Games
2010 Men's Hockey World Cup players
Field hockey players at the 2012 Summer Olympics
Field hockey players at the 2016 Summer Olympics
2014 Men's Hockey World Cup players
Field hockey players at the 2014 Commonwealth Games
Olympic field hockey players of Great Britain
British male field hockey players
People educated at Sutton Valence School
Commonwealth Games bronze medallists for England
Commonwealth Games medallists in field hockey
Hockey India League players
Holcombe Hockey Club players
HGC players
East Grinstead Hockey Club players
Men's England Hockey League players
Men's Hoofdklasse Hockey players
Medallists at the 2014 Commonwealth Games